Stephen F. Austin High School, more commonly known as Austin High, is a public high school in Austin, Texas, United States, and part of the Austin Independent School District (AISD). Founded in 1881, it is one of the oldest public high schools west of the Mississippi River, and was the one of the first public high schools in the state of Texas.

The campus is located near Downtown Austin along the Colorado River (Lady Bird Lake). The school, originally known simply as Austin High School, was renamed in 1953 after Stephen F. Austin, locally revered as the "Father of Texas". It is one of thirteen high schools in the Austin Independent School District.

Roughly 2,300 students attend the school in grades nine through twelve. The school's current building is its seventh, following four 19th-century and two 20th-century locations in other buildings.

Austin High's official motto is Mens Agitat Molem or, "Mind Over Matter". The official mascot is Mr. Maroo.

History
Austin High School opened in September 1881, with classes held on the third floor of the West Austin School building at 11th Street and Rio Grande Street. Due to population growth, instruction was held at the First Baptist Church, the temporary State Capitol, and the Smith Opera House. The first dedicated Austin High School campus, located at 9th and Trinity Streets, opened in 1900. In 1925, Austin High School moved to 1212 Rio Grande Street, the former building of John T. Allan Junior High School ( 1916), which had relocated to 9th at Trinity. Allan would relocate to East Austin in 1957, later convert to an elementary school, and close in 2013.

In 1956, the first seven African-American students began attending Austin High School as part of desegregation; a total of 13 black students attended white high schools in AISD at that time.

In 1975, Austin High School moved to its current building, designed by Jay W. Barnes II. The first classes at the Cesar Chavez campus commenced on August 25, 1975.

The Mr. Maroo mascot was officially adopted by the student council in the 1965–66 school year.

Campus
The current campus is bounded by Lady Bird Lake (formerly Town Lake) to the south and a controlled-access portion of Cesar Chavez Street to the north. Because of the school's relative isolation and the campus's relative newness, Amy Wells, author of Both Sides Now: The Story of School Desegregation’s Graduates, wrote that the school "has a somewhat suburban feel".

Academics

As of the late 1970s the school was considered to be the best in its area, according to Wells. It was known for having a university preparatory curriculum.

Austin High was called a National Blue Ribbon School in 1982–83.

Neighborhoods served
Downtown Austin, portions of Oak Hill, and the family apartment complexes of the University of Texas at Austin are zoned to Austin High School. Other Austin High neighborhoods include Zilker, Westcreek, Barton Hills, Travis Country, and Tarrytown.

Austin High School historically had a reputation as an elite school as it was associated with wealthy neighborhoods in the western part of Austin.

Student body
As of November 2020, Austin High School is 54% non-Hispanic White, 35.3% Hispanic, 3.7% Black, and 2.3% Asian. The school is 23.5% economically disadvantaged and 7.2% of students are English Language Learners.

In 2000 the school was 54% non-Hispanic White, 37% Hispanic and Latino, 8% black, and 2% Asian, reflecting the overall demographics of Austin. As of 1980 most of the White students originated from west Austin, including Tarrytown. There were also middle class and poor students. Some black students originated from Clarksville, an area housing servants' quarters that, until school desegregation, was served by segregated black schools. By 1980, court-ordered desegregation added a heavily Hispanic and Latino section of South Austin, and a black section of northeast Austin to the student population.

As of the late 1970s the school was 66% White, 19% Hispanic, and 15% African-American, making it one of the more racially balanced AISD schools; at the time there was less Hispanic representation and more White representation than the district average. In 1980 the federal court system forced AISD to begin desegregation busing.

Athletics
Austin High School offers many different athletic programs for students: football, basketball, tennis, golf, mountain biking, swimming, baseball, volleyball, soccer, track and field, cross country, lacrosse, ultimate frisbee, and cheerleading. The Austin High football team won the 1942 state championship.

Notable alumni

Jay Davis (1960), National Security Fellow and former director, Lawrence Livermore Laboratories
 Marshall Allman – actor, notable for roles on Humans, True Blood, and Prison Break
 Jake Andrews – blues rock guitarist
 Richard Moya – local and state politician
 Don Baylor – former Major League Baseball player and manager
 Ray Culp - Major League Baseball pitcher
 William Lee Bergstrom – high roller known for placing a single $777,000 bet on dice at the Horseshoe Casino in 1980
 Amy Moffett Brown - co-host of the Bobby Bones Show 
 Barbara Bush – daughter of U.S. President George W. Bush
 Jenna Bush Hager – daughter of U.S. President George W. Bush
 Liz Carpenter – author, lecturer, presidential advisor
 Gary Clark Jr. – Grammy Award-winning guitarist
 Ben Crenshaw – professional golfer, two-time winner of the Masters
 Lloyd Doggett – member of United States House of Representatives
 Bibb Falk – professional baseball player
 Kinky Friedman – comedian, politician
 Shakey Graves (Alejandro Rose-Garcia) – musician
 Isaiah "Zay" Jones – NFL wide receiver for the Jacksonville Jaguars
 Carole Keeton Strayhorn – politician, former Texas Comptroller
 Edmund Kuempel – state representative from Seguin
 Verne Lundquist – sportscaster, CBS Sports
 Ray Lynch – musician and composer
 Al Matthews – professional football player for the Green Bay Packers
 Mark McClellan – former Commissioner of the U.S. Food and Drug Administration and Administrator of the Centers for Medicare and Medicaid Services
 Scott McClellan – former White House Press Secretary for President George W. Bush and current Vice President for Communications at Seattle University
 Benjamin McKenzie – television actor; James Gordon in the television series Gotham
 Azie Taylor Morton – Treasurer of the United States under President Jimmy Carter
 David M. Parsons, 2011 Texas State Poet Laureate
 Harvey Penick – professional golfer
 Julie Powell – author of Julie & Julia
 Ben H. Procter – American historian at Texas Christian University, 1957-2000
 Richard "Cactus" Pryor – Texas radio legend
 Scott Ruffcorn – former Major League Baseball pitcher for the Chicago White Sox and Philadelphia Phillies
 Robert Schenkkan – award-winning playwright, screenwriter and actor
 Xavier Silas – former professional basketball player
 Django Walker – country music musician

References

External links

 

Educational institutions established in 1881
High schools in Austin, Texas
Austin Independent School District high schools
1881 establishments in Texas